Dariusz Bogusław "Darek" Popiela (born 27 July 1985) is a Polish slalom canoeist who has competed at the international level since 1999. He represented Austria until 2002.

Career 
Popiela won four medals in the K1 team event at the ICF Canoe Slalom World Championships with two silvers (2013, 2018) and two bronzes (2006, 2019). He also won two golds, six silvers and three bronzes at the European Championships.

Popiela finished 8th in the K1 event at the 2008 Summer Olympics in Beijing.

His father Bogusław and his uncle Henryk both represented Poland in canoe slalom.

Aside from sports, Popiela is also involved in leading projects dedicated to restoring Jewish heritage sites in the Nowy Sącz region. In 2019, Popiela and his team of volunteers installed a memorial at the Jewish cemetery in Grybów.

World Cup individual podiums

References

External links

1985 births
Canoeists at the 2008 Summer Olympics
Living people
Olympic canoeists of Poland
Sportspeople from Kraków
Polish male canoeists
Medalists at the ICF Canoe Slalom World Championships